The 540s decade ran from January 1, 540, to December 31, 549.

Significant people

Totila

References

Bibliography